Orange (stylized as orange) is a Japanese romance manga series written and illustrated by Ichigo Takano, aimed at the shōjo and seinen demographics. It was first serialized in 2012 in Bessatsu Margaret manga magazine and later in Monthly Action. It has been compiled into 7 volumes as of April, 2022. Its chapters are published online in English by Crunchyroll and in print by Seven Seas Entertainment. It is also published in France by Akata, in Poland by Waneko, and in Spain by Ediciones Tomodomo. A live action film adaptation of the same name was released on December 12, 2015. An anime television adaptation started to air in July 2016. A spin-off to the manga began serialization on March 25, 2016, in the Monthly Action magazine published by Futabasha. An anime theatrical film, titled Orange: Future, premiered in Japan on November 18, 2016.

Plot
In Matsumoto, Naho Takamiya, a second-year high school student, receives letters sent from herself 10 years into the future. Her future self asks her to prevent her "biggest regrets", which has something to do with the new transfer student from Tokyo, a boy named Kakeru Naruse. At first skeptical, Naho begins to believe the letters as they accurately predict events. When the letter asks her not to invite Kakeru to go out for the first day, Naho and her friends (Hiroto Suwa, Takako Chino, Saku Hagita and Azusa Murasaka) decide to invite him anyway. Kakeru ends up not attending school for the next two weeks.

To prevent another mistake, Naho resolves to do what the letters order her to do, such as volunteering on a softball round, encouraging Kakeru to join the soccer team, objecting to him pursuing a relationship with an upperclassman, and insisting they watch the fireworks alone. Naho learns from the letters in the future Kakeru is dead, having died by suicide around Valentine's Day in the same school year in which he enrolled.

During the Bon Festival, Kakeru explains to Naho the reason for his absence: his mother died by suicide because of a mental breakdown caused by him leaving her for friends, and not taking her to the hospital on the day of enrollment as he promised. This causes Naho to also feel guilty, as she feels they share responsibility for Kakeru's mother's death. Later on, Suwa tells Naho he has also received letters from his future self, asking him to be a good friend to Kakeru and save him from his death. Suwa hides the fact he and Naho are married and have a child in the future, as he realizes Naho and Kakeru are in love. Although he has feelings for Naho, his future self realizes by saving Kakeru, he is giving up a future with Naho. Because he knows of their feelings, he listens to the letters and supports them as much as possible. Later, Azusa, and Hagita, and Chino admitted they have received similar letters. They all agree though they may not be able to change the fate of their future selves, they may create a parallel universe where Kakeru is still alive.

To cheer up Kakeru, the five friends organize a celebration for his 17th birthday, in which Kakeru confesses his feelings to a surprised Naho. The five also join the relay race team to back Kakeru. With his friends' encouragement, Kakeru wins the race. As his reward for winning the race, Kakeru kisses Naho. However, on New Year's Eve, Naho and Kakeru argue over the latter's grandmother's health. The two become distant over the following weeks, up until the day Kakeru is supposed to die by suicide, as Naho manages to confess her feelings as well as telling Kakeru to share his plan for suicide.

On the night of Kakeru's supposed death, the friends' plan to meet up is interrupted as Kakeru does not arrive on time. The five search throughout Matsumoto and manage to stop him from getting hit by a truck. Kakeru apologizes, telling them he had been thinking of suicide, but at the last second decided not to after realizing it would mean he would never see his friends again.

Characters
 

A high school girl who receives a letter from herself ten years in the future, informing herself that she will meet a guy named Kakeru who she must keep an eye on. At first she ignores the letter, but when she realizes that everything written in it actually happens, she decides to listen to the letters in order to save Kakeru. She and Kakeru have romantic feelings toward one another. Although at first unaware of each others feelings, due to her future selves regrets about not informing him of her true feelings, she informs him of her feelings, and they are able to start dating.

A transfer student from Tokyo. On the first day of classes, he was supposed to take his mother to the hospital, but instead he was invited to go out with Naho and her friends, and ditches her. As he's out with his friends, she texts him asking where he is, and he replies saying she can go by herself, that she's not a kid, and to leave him alone because he's with friends. Due to a mental breakdown, his mother committed suicide. Blaming himself for his mother's suicide, Kakeru falls into deep depression for a while, and eventually commits suicide while making everyone think it was an accident. In the current future, he and Naho start dating, and his friends prevent his suicide.

Naho's friend who is in love with her. Despite knowing of Naho's and Kakeru's feelings for each other, ten years after Kakeru's death, he and Naho are married with a child. After watching Naho's sad face, he realizes Naho still has feelings for Kakeru, and acknowledges Naho and Kakeru would probably have been together had Kakeru not committed suicide. He writes a letter to his past self and asks himself to help prevent Kakeru's suicide, and to be encouraging of Naho and Kakeru's happiness together, even if it means he doesn't have a future with her if Kakeru is alive.

Naho's friend who received a letter from her future self. She and Azusa are best friends. They speculate that Naho and Suwa are hiding the fact that they have letters from their future selves, and only reveal they've gotten letters from their future selves when Naho and Suwa do. She and Azusa support both Kakeru and Suwa when it comes to Naho.

Naho's friend who likes reading manga. He received a letter from himself and helps Kakeru. He likes Azusa but denies it.

Naho's friend who received a letter from her future self and helps the group keep Kakeru from dying. She teases Hagita about them being a couple and harasses him, to which he denies he likes her.

A girl who usually watches Kakeru's soccer games and is interested in Kakeru. She confessed her feelings to Kakeru and they started dating. To which Naho, who is in love with Kakeru, becomes emotionally devastated. After her split with Kakeru, she bullies Naho but is constantly confronted by Takako, Hagita, Azusa and Suwa.

Media

Manga
The original manga series is written and illustrated by Ichigo Takano, and originally began serialization on March 13, 2012 in Shueisha's Bessatsu Margaret, however switched to Futabasha's Monthly Action in 2013. The first tankōbon was released by Shueisha on July 25, 2012, who published two volumes of the series. The first two volumes were later republished by Futabasha on December 25, 2013. The manga ended serialization on August 25, 2015, and the fifth volume was published on November 12, 2015. The sixth volume consists of chapters based on the Orange: Future film  and the Orange: Suwa Hiroto two-part spin-off manga, and was released on May 31, 2017. It was also announced in that volume that the series would get a seventh volume, and that the seventh volume would be the final volume. The series is licensed in English in North America by Seven Seas Entertainment, who published the series in two omnibus volumes. Crunchyroll Manga simultaneously published the series on their website.

A spin off manga began serialization in Monthly Action on March 25, 2016.

Live action

A live-action film adaptation was released on December 12, 2015 in Japan with Tao Tsuchiya and Kento Yamazaki as the main characters; directed by Kojiro Hashimoto and written by Arisa Kaneko.

Anime
The anime adaptation of Orange is produced by Telecom Animation Film and directed by Hiroshi Hamasaki and Naomi Nakayama, with Yūko Kakihara handling series scripts, Nobuteru Yūki designing the characters and Hiroaki Tsutsumi composing the music. The series premiered on July 4, 2016 on Tokyo MX and AT-X. The series was simulcast on Crunchyroll outside of Asia, while Funimation produced an English dub as the series aired.

Episode list

Film
An anime theatrical film, titled , was announced at the end of the television anime's final episode. The film will retell the series' main story from Suwa's viewpoint, and will also feature an original story written by Takano which is set after the anime and manga series. It is scheduled for a 2-week premiere in Japanese theaters that premiered on November 18, 2016.

Reception
Volume 1 reached the 30th place on the weekly Oricon manga chart and, as of July 29, 2012, has sold 31,451 copies; volume 2 reached the 31st place and, as of December 2, 2012, has sold 68,977 copies; volume 3 reached the 20th place and, as of September 7, 2014, has sold 111,934 copies.

On manga-news.com, it has a staff grade of 17.5 out of 20; volume 1 was chosen by the staff as one of the top manga of the week as a "new [release] crush" and volume 2 was also chosen as one of the top manga of the week. On planetebd.com, it has a staff grade of "good, nice". It was number 23 on the 15th Book of the Year list by Da Vinci magazine. The series ranked twelfth in the first Next Manga Award in the print manga category.

The English release was reviewed favorably by Rebecca Silverman of Anime News Network, who gave both omnibus collections an overall A− score. She praised the "poignant and moving" story, but warned the issue of suicide may make it a difficult read for some people. Eva de Gans of Dutch magazine Aniway recommended the series, praising its visuals and "endearing and relatable" cast of characters, while criticizing Naho and Kakeru's characterizations as passive, timid characters and the "unconvincing" explanation of the time travel. The series was nominated for the 2017 Eisner Award in the "Best U.S. Edition of International Material—Asia" category.

The second omnibus volume reached number 1 on The New York Times Best Seller list for manga on June 19, 2016, where it remained on the list for four weeks.

See also
 Yume Miru Taiyō, another series by the same author

References

External links
 Official manga website 
 Official anime website 
 Orange at Crunchyroll
 

Crunchyroll anime
Crunchyroll manga
Funimation
Futabasha manga
Manga adapted into films
Romance anime and manga
Seinen manga
Seven Seas Entertainment titles
Shōjo manga
Shueisha manga
Slice of life anime and manga
Toho Animation
TMS Entertainment
Suicide in television